Fork Township is a civil township of Mecosta County in the U.S. state of Michigan. The population was 1,678 at the 2000 census.

History
Fork Township was organized in 1867.

Communities
Deciple was an unincorporated place focused around a shingle mill.  It had a post office from 1884 until 1894.

Geography

Demographics
As of the census of 2000, there were 1,678 people, 669 households, and 487 families residing in the township. The racial makeup of the township was 97.62% White, 0.77% African American, 0.48% Native American, and 1.13% from two or more races. Hispanic or Latino of any race were 1.37% of the population.

There were 669 households, out of which 29.1% had children under the age of 18 living with them, 58.9% were married couples living together, 9.1% had a female householder with no husband present, and 27.1% were non-families. 23.3% of all households were made up of individuals, and 11.4% had someone living alone who was 65 years of age or older.  The average household size was 2.50 and the average family size was 2.91.

In the township the population was spread out, with 25.4% under the age of 18, 6.4% from 18 to 24, 24.3% from 25 to 44, 26.1% from 45 to 64, and 17.8% who were 65 years of age or older.  The median age was 41 years. For every 100 females, there were 96.9 males.  For every 100 females age 18 and over, there were 94.6 males.

The median income for a household in the township was $28,750, and the median income for a family was $31,486. Males had a median income of $27,105 versus $21,397 for females. The per capita income for the township was $14,124.  About 11.9% of families and 14.8% of the population were below the poverty line, including 22.4% of those under age 18 and 5.2% of those age 65 or over.

References

Notes

Sources

Townships in Mecosta County, Michigan
1867 establishments in Michigan
Townships in Michigan